The Chief of the Air Staff (CFS, or Flygstabschef) is the professional head of the Swedish Air Staff. The post was created in 1936 with lieutenant colonel Bengt Nordenskiöld as the first incumbent. The post disappeared in 1994 and was reintroduced in 2019 when the new Air Staff was established.

History
The Chief of the Air Staff was from 1936 to 1994 the second most senior member of the Swedish Air Force after the Chief of the Air Force and headed the Air Staff. The position was initially held by a colonel (1937–1943) and later by a major general (1943–1994). When the Air Staff was disbanded in 1994, the office was eliminated. In 2019, the Air Staff was re-established and a Chief of the Air Staff was appointed again, this time held by a colonel.

Between 1943 and 1966, the post of Vice Chief of the Air Staff existed. According to the rules of procedure for the Air Staff issued on 1 March 1962, the Vice Chief of the Air Staff (and the Air Surveillance Inspector and the Air Safety Inspector) were given responsibility for various departments and other organizational units within the Air Staff's areas of activity so that these executives in effect subsequently served as section heads.

Chiefs of the Air Staff

Chiefs of the Air Staff (1936–1994)

Chiefs of the Air Staff (2019–present)

Vice Chiefs of the Air Staff

Footnotes

References

Print

Web

Military appointments of Sweden
1936 establishments in Sweden
1994 disestablishments in Sweden
2019 establishments in Sweden
Air force chiefs of staff